Kivon Cartwright (born March 3, 1992) is an American football tight end who is currently a free agent. He played college football at Colorado State.

Professional career
Cartwright signed a reserve/future contract with the Buccaneers on January 4, 2017. On May 1, 2017, he was waived by the Buccaneers.

References

External links
 Tampa Bay Buccaneers bio

1992 births
Living people
American football tight ends
Colorado State Rams football players
Tampa Bay Buccaneers players
Sportspeople from Pueblo, Colorado
Players of American football from Colorado